Bojnord (also romanized Bojnūrd, Bujnūrd, Bojnoord, Bojnord or Bujnurd), known in the Middle Ages as Buzanjird, is the capital city of North Khorasan Province, Iran.

History 
According to local tradition, the whole area was controlled by the Qarai Turks since the Mongol invasion in the 13th century.

Bojnurd is of recent origin and possibly built by the Safavids for the Kurdish Şadiyan tribe who had been settled there to strengthen the Safavid borders against hostile Turkics. Traditionally, the city was surrounded by a defensive wall and consisted of eleven quarters, bazaars and four mosques. 

In 1849, the city saw a revolt which destroyed the city. When traveller G. C. Napier visited the city in 1876, it was noted that the chief of Bojnurd was a Kurd who governed the city without taxation in exchange for military support to the central government in Tehran.

The city experienced severe earthquakes in 1896 and 1929 which destroyed the city and its surroundings. The city would consequently be rebuilt without historical or recent fortifications in a modern matter. In 1997, a magnitude 6.5 earthquake caused significant damage and many fatalities in the city.

ٔGeography 
Bojnourd city, the capital of North Khorasan province with an area of 36 square kilometers, is located in northeastern Iran at 57 degrees and 20 minutes longitude and 37 degrees and 28 minutes latitude south of Kopedagh mountain range and east of Aladagh mountain range and north of Alborz mountain range. Bojnourd is 1070 meters above sea level and its distance to Tehran is 821 kilometers.

Climate
Bojnord has a cold semi-arid climate (BSk) according to the Köppen climate classification.

Colleges and universities 
Universities located in Bojnord include:
 University of Bojnurd
 North Khorasan University of Medical Sciences
 Islamic Azad University of Bojnurd
 Eshragh Institute of Higher Education (Bojnurd, North Khorasan)
 Payam Noor University of Bojnurd

Notables from Bojnurd

 Abdolhossein Teymourtash (Sardar Moazzam Khorasani), a distinguished and influential politician of the 20th century (Pahlavi Dynasty)
 Ali-Akbar Davar, politician and judge and the founder of the modern judicial system of Iran
 Kazem Mousavi Bojnurdi, historian, theologian, writer and the curator of the National Library of Iran (1997–2005)
 Mohammad Davari, journalist, known for arrest in 2009–10 Iranian election protests
 Ehsan Khoshbakht, film critic and curator and the co-director of Il Cinema Ritrovato in Bologna, Italy

References

External links 

Cities in North Khorasan Province
Iranian provincial capitals
Populated places in Bojnord County
Kurdish settlements in Iran